The Joint Committee on Statutory Instruments is a joint committee of the Parliament of the United Kingdom. The remit of the committee is to scrutinise all statutory instruments made in exercise of powers granted by Acts of Parliament. Instruments laid before the House of Commons alone are considered by the Select Committee on Statutory Instruments, which is composed of the Commons members of the joint committee.

Membership
As of May 2021, the members of the committee are as follows:

See also
Joint Committee of the Parliament of the United Kingdom
Parliamentary Committees of the United Kingdom

External links
Joint Committee on Statutory Instruments, UK Parliament
The records of the Joint Committee on Statutory Instruments are held by the Parliamentary Archives

Stat
Stat
Statutory Instruments of the United Kingdom